SLT may refer to:

Medicine 
 Selective laser trabeculoplasty, an eye surgery
 Speech and language therapy

Technology 

 Compaq SLT, a laptop computer line of the 1980s and 1990s
 Sony SLT camera, a 1990s digital camera type
 IBM Solid Logic Technology, a 1960s hybrid integrated circuit design
 Sri Lanka Telecom, a telephone company

Transportation 
 Harriet Alexander Field, an airfield in Colorado, US (IATA code)
 Mercedes-Benz SLT-Class, a car model (built 1996–2020)
 South Lancs Travel, an English bus operator
 Sprinter Lighttrain, a Dutch electric train class (built 2007–2012)

Other uses 
 Slovenian tolar, defunct currency
 Situational leadership theory, of organizations